Madame Lu or Madame Lu, the Woman for Discreet Advice (German: Madame Lu, die Frau für diskrete Beratung) is a 1929 German silent film directed by Franz Hofer and starring Ida Wüst, Gerdi Gerdt and Hans Mierendorff.

The film's art direction was by Leopold Blonder.

Cast
 Ida Wüst as Madame Lu  
 Gerdi Gerdt as The girl  
 Hans Mierendorff 
 Eva Speyer 
 Robert Thiem
 Rudolf Lettinger 
 Sybill Morel 
 Karl Platen 
 Leo Peukert 
 Antonie Jaeckel 
 Sophie Pagay 
 Maria Forescu as Abortionist  
 Trude Lehmann

Bibliography
 Bock, Hans-Michael & Bergfelder, Tim. The Concise CineGraph. Encyclopedia of German Cinema. Berghahn Books, 2009.

References

External links

1929 films
Films of the Weimar Republic
Films directed by Franz Hofer
German silent feature films
German black-and-white films